The Artful Dodger was a short-lived black-and-white British sitcom starring Dave Morris and Gretchen Franklin. It ran for one series in 1959. It was written by Frank Roscoe and Dave Morris.

Cast
Dave Morris – Himself
Joe Gladwin – Cedric Butterworth
Gretchen Franklin – Sylvia Morris
John Barrie – Mr Grimshaw

Plot
In the radio and television series Club Night, Dave Morris, the comedian, had developed a swaggering, work-shy, know-all character, and The Artful Dodger featured the same character. Sylvia was his wife.

Episodes
Episode One (28 September 1959)
Episode twice (5 October 1959)
Episode Three (12 October 1959)
Episode Four (19 October 1959)
Episode Five (26 October 1959)
Episode Six (2 November 1959)

References
Mark Lewisohn, "Radio Times Guide to TV Comedy", BBC Worldwide Ltd, 2003
British TV Comedy Guide for The Artful Dodger

1959 British television series debuts
1959 British television series endings
1950s British sitcoms
BBC television sitcoms
Lost BBC episodes